Dehnow-e Chahdegan (also Romanized as Dehnow-e Chāhdegān; also known as Dehnow-e Chahdegāl) is a village in Chahdegal Rural District, Negin Kavir District, Fahraj County, Kerman Province, Iran. At the 2006 census, its population was 245, in 59 families.

References 

Populated places in Fahraj County